Farm to Market Road 949 (FM 949) is a state highway in the U.S. state of Texas. The two-lane highway starts at FM 102 northwest of Eagle Lake in Colorado County, heads in a northerly direction across Interstate 10, swings northeast through the small communities of Bernardo and Cat Spring and ends at State Highway 36 (SH 36) near Peters in Austin County.

Route description
FM 949 begins near the one-time community of Ramsey, which was located on FM 102 between Eagle Lake and Alleyton. From its starting point, FM 949 heads northeast  to an intersection with FM 2761. From there, the highway turns sharply to the northwest and goes  before coming to a bridge over I-10. The interstate highway can be accessed in both directions via entrance and exit ramps. After continuing in a northwesterly direction for less than one mile to Frelsburg Road, FM 949 turns sharply to the northeast again. From this intersection, the highway turns to a slightly more easterly course for  before coming to the junction with FM 2429. FM 949 goes another  in a southeasterly direction before terminating at SH 36 a short distance north of Peters.

History
On December 7, 1972, the highway extended over the former FM 1088 right-of-way, ending at SH 36 near Peters. This extension added .

Major intersections

See also

References

0949
Transportation in Austin County, Texas
Transportation in Colorado County, Texas